The Execution of the Doge Marino Faliero is an oil painting on canvas of 1826 by the French Romantic artist Eugène Delacroix, inspired by the 1821 play Marino Faliero, Doge of Venice by Lord Byron, which in turn was based upon events in the life of the Venetian Doge Marino Faliero (1274–1355). Today the work is part of the Wallace Collection in London; as of 2021 it is listed as "not on display".

Description
The painting depicts the immediate aftermath of the beheading of Faliero, which had taken place on the Scala dei Giganti (Giant's Staircase) of the Doge's Palace. The staircase, where Marino was also inaugurated as doge, is located within the interior of the building rather than facing out into St Mark's Square. While Faliero's now headless body lies at the bottom of the escarpment clad in white after his having been stripped of his ducal vestments, members of the Council of Ten and other Venetian aristocrats in fine, brightly coloured garments are gathered atop it, including one member of the Council of Ten who holds up the sword which was used to behead Faliero. It has been suggested that the instrument of death is being displayed by the official to the few members of the public who can see the goings on in the palace from the square, as was articulated in Byron's play.

The painting has been discussed as a commentary on the Bourbon Dynasty in France under the rule of Charles X. It has also been described as redolent of the genre of Romantic Theater which was prevalently produced as a form of popular entertainment of the time.

References

External links

1826 paintings
History paintings
Paintings by Eugène Delacroix
Paintings in the Wallace Collection